Estádio dos Kuricutelas, inaugurated in 23 October 1947 as Estádio do Ferroviário de Nova Lisboa is a multi-use stadium in Huambo, Angola.  It is owned by Ferroviário do Huambo and is currently used mostly for football matches, on club level by J.G.M. of the Girabola. The stadium has a capacity of 10,000 spectators.

Kurikutelas has been the venue of several international matches.

References

External links
Profile at girabola.com

Football venues in Angola
Huambo